Haho is a prefecture located in the Plateaux Region of Togo. The prefecture seat is located in Notsé.

Canton (administrative divisions) of Haho include Notsé, Wahala, Ayito, Assrama, Kpédomé, Dalia, Atsavé, and Djéméni. On October 12, 2018, two new cantons were created in Haho: Akpakpapé (commune 3) and Hahomégbé (commune 1).

The area is the ancestral land of the Aja people and Ewe people. Cotton and peanuts are major commercial crops.

References 

Prefectures of Togo
Plateaux Region, Togo